The 2000–01 UCLA Bruins men's basketball team represented the University of California, Los Angeles in the 2000–01 NCAA Division I men's basketball season.  The team finished 3rd in the Pacific-10 Conference with a 14-4 conference record, 23-9 overall.  The Bruins competed in the 2001 NCAA Division I men's basketball tournament, losing to the eventual champion Duke Blue Devils in the sweet sixteen.

Roster

Schedule

|-
!colspan=9 style=|Exhibition

|-
!colspan=9 style=|Regular Season

|-
!colspan=9 style=| NCAA tournament

Source

References

UCLA Bruins
Ucla
UCLA Bruins men's basketball seasons
NCAA
NCAA